Aalto University Undergraduate Center is a building designed by the Architect Alvar Aalto. Originally the building was designed to serve as the main building of the Helsinki University of Technology. Today it is one of the main buildings of the Aalto University's campus in Otaniemi, Espoo.

The first part of the building was completed in 1965 and the extension with the major auditoriums in 1975.  The library building of the university was completed in 1969, also designed by Alvar Aalto. The main building and the library are crucial part of the campus that is defined to be national cultural heritage of Finland.  It became the Undergraduate Center, one of the main buildings of the new Aalto University, and all the buildings were renovated in the early days of the Aalto University.

References 

Aalto University
Alvar Aalto buildings
Buildings and structures in Espoo